Mu Beta Psi National Honorary Musical Fraternity is a service and music fraternity with chapters and colonies at universities throughout the eastern United States.

Although an honorary fraternity, Mu Beta Psi views itself as primarily a music service group. The national fraternity and several of its chapters run scholarship programs and pride themselves on providing service to their music departments.

Any member of the fraternity is referred to as a brother without regard to the member's sex. This practice comes from the fraternity's beginnings and is used in context as a designation of membership, not of gender.

History

Founding and early years
Mu Beta Psi National Honorary Musical Fraternity was founded on November 5, 1925 at North Carolina State College by music director Percy W. "Daddy" Price and a group of 12 men from the class of 1926 who were involved in campus music organizations. The purposes of the fraternity were to promote music in its proper place as an educational subject, foster a fellowship among musicians, and stimulate interest in music across the college campus. Over the next few years, Price determined that the fraternity was different from the other music groups on campus and deemed it worthy of growing into a national organization with multiple chapters.

With the addition of Beta Chapter at Davidson College in early 1929, the organization started to grow. Meetings of the two chapters in late 1929 and early 1930 resulted in the adoption of the fraternity's constitution. The national organization was founded on April 26, 1930, accompanied by the elections of the first national officers. With a strong desire for Mu Beta Psi to realize its true potential, Price pushed hard for the fraternity's expansion. Some of the earliest prospects included Wake Forest and William & Mary.

Price's life was cut short by a heart attack in 1933. His successor as music director, Christian D. Kutschinski, continued to promote Mu Beta Psi. He became National Executive Secretary in the mid-1930s and sought to expand the fraternity wherever and whenever possible.

Despite the challenges of the Great Depression and Beta Chapter going inactive, Delta Chapter was established at Clemson College in 1937. Alpha and Delta Chapters would remain active side-by-side for the next 68 years.

World War II and the 1950s

World War II brought about new challenges for Mu Beta Psi. As many students graduated and others entered the armed forces to fight overseas, chapter activity was limited. With the war's successful conclusion, Kutschinski helped Delta Chapter reorganize and increase its active membership. Alpha and Delta Chapters met for a National Convention in 1949.

The 1950s saw the majority of Chapter activities take place on the local level, with minimal collaboration between the chapters. Despite a desire to meet for a convention every year, they would not do so until 1957.

1960s

The 1961 National Convention marked an important milestone for Mu Beta Psi, when the National Constitution was amended to allow membership to women.  Additionally, a national publication was created, which would become known as The Clef. New expansion efforts were also put into place. This was also the first of an unbroken chain of annual conventions that continues to this day.

The Fraternity saw additional changes in both leadership and expansion. Kutschinski stepped down as National Executive Secretary in 1962. Three years later, Ralph W. Daniel was elected to the position and would serve for the next 18 years. Two new chapters were installed, the first in nearly two decades. One was Epsilon Chapter at Washington & Lee University in 1965, which would remain active for nearly 20 years. The other was Zeta Chapter at Michigan Technological University in 1967, which was the result of a successful merger with Tri-Beta Honorary Band Fraternity. Zeta remains active to this day. 1965 also saw the adoption of the "Editor of The Clef" as a National Officer. "Hail the Spirit," written by Milton C. Bliss, was adopted as the Fraternity Song in 1967.

1970s and 1980s

The fraternity continued a period of gradual expansion in the 1970s and 1980s. The Alumni Association was formally established in early 1970, providing college graduates with a chapter to continue their participation in the fraternity's activities. The short-lived Eta Chapter was installed at Virginia Military Institute in mid-1970. Theta Chapter was established at Saint Augustine's College in 1973, and remained active for 13 years. Iota Chapter was established at Duke University in 1981 and went inactive 3 years later. Kappa Chapter was established at Wofford College in 1989 and stayed active for 7 years. The mid-1980s also saw the creation of the Permanent Board of Trustees for the purpose of ensuring stability in the organization. The first members of the Permanent Board included Wallace DesChamps, Charlie Emki, David Wilson and Bryan Reamer.

1990s

Mu Beta Psi underwent more development in the early 1990s. The National Organization underwent a reorganization with the division of responsibilities and the creation of new national offices, including the Vice President of Chapter Maintenance, Vice President of Expansion, National Treasurer, and National Historian. The National Constitution was revised and approved in 1996. Three members of the Permanent Board resigned and were replaced by Joseph Bledsoe, Timothy Kudlock, and Gayle Kirby. Another resignation a few years later resulted in confirmation of Benjamin Griffeth to the Board. In terms of expansion efforts, Lambda Chapter was established at Anderson University in 1991, only to go inactive a year later. Mu Chapter was established in 1993 at UNC-Chapel Hill and would remain active for 19 years. The fraternity also extended northward with the establishment of Nu Chapter at SUNY Oswego in 1994 and Xi Chapter at Saint Vincent College in 1996. Nu is currently active and Xi remained active for 10 years.

2000s

The 2000s saw Matthew Zander and Andrew Fleming confirmed to the Permanent Board. Five new Chapters were established, the largest period of growth to date. Omicron Chapter was established at Roanoke College in 2001. In 2007, the Brothers of Mu Upsilon Alpha (the honorary, co-educational service fraternity of the Rutgers University Bands) at Rutgers merged with Mu Beta Psi to establish Pi Chapter. Rho Chapter was established at Northern Michigan University in 2008. A year later, Mu Beta Psi crossed the Mississippi River for the first time with the establishment of Sigma Chapter at Saint Louis University in 2009, although it would quickly go inactive.

2010s

During the 2010s, Mu Beta Psi officially established a national scholarship which is open to college students at the locations where it maintains active chapters. In 2011, Tau Chapter was established at American University in Washington, D.C.  One member of the Permanent Board resigned, and Christopher Ciarlariello and Danielle Booms were confirmed to the Permanent Board of Trustees. The position of Chief Financial Officer was added to the Permanent Board, as an appointed Specialized Advisory Position. The 2018 Convention saw two policy milestones approved by the organization. All National policies were amended with gender neutral language, as the organization accepts members without regard to their gender identity. A new fraternal life and conduct policy was adopted "to achieve the safest environment possible for our members, pledges, and guests."

Purpose 
Mu Beta Psi concentrates its efforts in support of the following four purposes:
 To honor those outstanding individuals who have devoted their time and efforts to the musical organizations at the educational institutions of the respective Chapters.
 To stimulate interest in the musical organizations at the educational institutions of the respective Chapters.
 To advance music to its proper place as an educational subject.
 To actively promote fellowship among musicians everywhere.

Chapters 
The chapters were named in order of their acceptance to Mu Beta Psi. Chapters are:

† Gamma Chapter was never formally designated; Percy W. Price died before a school could be finalized and a Charter issued, and the effort was lost.  Records indicate that Gamma Chapter was to be established at The College of William and Mary, but colonization efforts were ultimately unsuccessful.

‡ Kappa Chapter went inactive in 1996, but was reactivated on April 25, 2020—the first such successful reactivation in fraternity history.

§ Mu Beta Psi Alumni Association is a separate organization, but considered an active chapter.  The Alumni Association is open to alumni of all Mu Beta Psi chapters, active or otherwise.

National Presidents 
The following is a list of the National Presidents of Mu Beta Psi since the establishment of the Fraternity's National Organization in 1929. The office was vacant on two separate occasions. The first was from 1932 through 1957, although Christian D. Kutschinski used the title National President interchangeably with National Executive Secretary during that time. The second instance was between 1958 when Wade Hicks resigned and the 1961 National Convention.

Notable alumni 

Lachi (Mu): Singer-songwriter, producer, author, and founder of the UNC Cadence
L. Macon Epps (Alpha): Inventor and engineer who worked for the Grumman Aerospace Corporation for 37 years, including on the Apollo Lunar Module as Assistant Program Manager
Tamar Greene (Nu): Broadway singer; assumed the role of George Washington in the Broadway production of Hamilton in January 2020 after playing the same role in the Chicago production from 2018-19

See also

 Professional fraternities and sororities

References

Fraternities and sororities in the United States
Music organizations based in the United States
North Carolina State University
Honor societies
Student organizations established in 1925
American University
Rutgers University
Michigan Technological University
State University of New York at Oswego
Northern Michigan University
1925 establishments in North Carolina